Opium is a studio double album by German-born guitarist Ottmar Liebert and his band Luna Negra. The album's first disc is called "Wide-Eyed" and features an upbeat, nuevo flamenco sound, reflective of Liebert's previous work. The second disc is called "Dreaming" which features a mellower, ethereal sound. Opium was nominated for a Grammy Award in 1997 for Best New Age Album. The album was inspired by a postcard that Liebert received from his paternal grandfather, who had worked on the South Manchuria Railway. Opium was produced by Ottmar Liebert, along with his brother, Stefan Liebert.

Track listing

Personnel

Ottmar Liebert + Luna Negra
Ottmar Liebert – Flamenco Guitar, Fretless Lute, Electric Guitar, Synthesizer
Jon Gagan – Electric Bass Guitars, Synthesizer
Stefan Liebert – Drum Programming, Samples
Mark Clark – Percussion
Eric Schermerhorn – Electric Guitar
Woody Thompson – Percussion
Carl Coletti – Drum Kit

Additional personnel
Magali Amadei – voices
Ashkan Sahihi – voices
Bok Yun Chon – voices
Lobsang Samten – voices
Olga Kammerer – voices
Charles Rook – engineering
Gary Lyons – engineering, mixing
Doug Sax – mastering
Gavin Lurssen – mastering

Sales and certifications

Notes 

 1. All music written by Ottmar Liebert + published by Sony ATV Songs/Luna Negra Music/BMI.
 2. Mastering: Analog – at The Mastering Lab in Los Angeles, CA

References

External links 

 The official website for Ottmar Liebert & Luna Negra Music.
 Opium biography
 Wide-Eyed + Dreaming – Live DVD
 Opium RIAA Gold & Platinum certifications

1997 albums
Ottmar Liebert albums